The 2021 Texas Southern Tigers football team represented Texas Southern University in the 2021 NCAA Division I FCS football season. The Tigers played their home games at BBVA Stadium in Houston, Texas, and competed in the West Division of the Southwestern Athletic Conference (SWAC). They were led by third-year head coach Clarence McKinney.  The game against North American University is not included in the Southwestern Athletic Conference standings because it was classed as an exhibition game and was not countable due to NCAA policies.

Schedule

Game summaries

Prairie View A&M

at Baylor

at Rice

North American

vs. Southern

at Grambling State

Alcorn State

Arkansas–Pine Bluff

at No. 19 Jackson State

Alabama A&M

at Alabama State

References

Texas Southern
Texas Southern Tigers football seasons
Texas Southern Tigers football